Kansuke Yamamoto may refer to:
  (1501–1561), Japanese samurai warrior 
  (1914–1987), Japanese artist